Garrison is a hamlet in Putnam County, New York, United States. It is part of the town of Philipstown, on the east side of the Hudson River, across from the United States Military Academy at West Point. The Garrison Metro-North Railroad station serves the town. Garrison (a.k.a. Garrison's Landing) was named after 2nd Lieutenant Isaac Garrison, who held a property lot on the Hudson River across from West Point and conducted a ferry service across the Hudson River between the two hamlets. Isaac and his son Beverly Garrison fought in the Battle of Fort Montgomery in 1777, were captured by the British and later set free.

The Garrison train wreck took place near Garrison on the Great Hudson River Railway on October 24, 1897, killing 20 people.

For the 1969 film Hello, Dolly! starring Barbra Streisand, Garrison was the filming location for the Yonkers scenes. The Saint Basil Academy in the town served as the finish line of The Amazing Race 10 in 2006.

Organizations
Garrison is home to many non-profit and cultural organizations. Manitoga is the extensive woodland gardens estate of modernist designer Russel Wright, and the location of his National Register of Historic Places listed modern style house Dragon Rock. It is operated by the non-profit Russel Wright Design Center, with tours and hiking trails. The Hudson Valley Shakespeare Festival, founded in 1987 with its first performances at Manitoga, is now located at Boscobel, a Federal-style mansion (built 1804–1808) for the Morris States Dyckman family. Constitution Marsh is an Audubon sanctuary with walking trails and canoe tours on the Hudson River. The Hudson Highlands Land Trust promotes and assists in local conservation efforts.

The Garrison Institute is a progressive interfaith organization and retreat center. The Hastings Center, founded in 1969, is an internationally recognized bioethics think tank and research center. The Garrison Art Center promotes local and regional artists. The national corporate headquarters of Outward Bound USA, the worldwide premier outdoor adventure and educational organization is also located in Garrison.

Media 
Garrison is served by two weekly newspapers: The Highlands Current, founded in 2010 and published on Friday, and the Putnam County News & Recorder, founded in 1868 and published on Wednesday.

Schools
Garrison is home of the Garrison Union Free School, or GUFS. GUFS is a K–8 school. Graduating students have the choice of going to Haldane High School in Cold Spring or across the river to James O'Neill High School in Highland Falls for high school.

Haldane High School is located in Cold Spring and was awarded a Blue Ribbon school in 2016. Some notable teachers include Lee Posniack (Earth Science & Astronomy/Meteorology), Lou Sassano (Math Department), Mark Patinella (Biology & Forensics), Brian Ogden (Global History), and Dr. Eric Richter (English).

The Manitou Learning Center is a private Garrison school that emphasizes bilingual education, experiential learning and purposeful play.

Notable people
 Roger Ailes, former Fox News CEO
 Thomas Harlan Ellett, architect
 Hamilton Fish, former US Secretary of State
 Sergeant Hamilton Fish II, a member of Theodore Roosevelt's "Park Avenue Contingent", and the first of the Rough Riders to die, was killed near Sevilla, Cuba on June 23, 1898, and is buried in the St. Phillips Church Cemetery in Garrison, NY.
 Hamilton Fish III, former US Congressman
 Isaac Garrison, 2nd Lieut. Revolutionary War, Captured by the British with 14 year old son, Beverly Garrison, Battle of Ft. Montgomery 1777. Founder of Garrison's Landing.
 James Gleick, writer
 Jim Hall, jazz musician, composer, and arranger lived in Garrison
 Patty Hearst, newspaper heiress and convicted bank robber, lives in Garrison 
 Don McLean, singer-songwriter and guitarist
 George Pataki, former New York State Governor, lives in Garrison
John Pielmeier—playwright, screenwriter and novelist—lives in Garrison with his wife, writer Irene O'Garden.
 Edwards Pierrepont, prominent attorney, jurist, and orator. Built 1867 Hurst-Pierrepont Estate in Garrison.
 Andrew C. Revkin, New York Times environmental writer, lives in Garrison
 Duncan Sheik, songwriter, movie score contributor and Broadway composer, lives in Garrison.
 Julie Taymor, theater, film and opera director, lives in Garrison.
 Juan Montoya, architect and interior designer, lives in Garrison
 Rhinelander Waldo, former New York City fire commissioner and police commissioner
 Matt Williams, television producer, lives in Garrison.
 Chris Hughes, co-founder of Facebook

References

External links

Hamlets in Putnam County, New York
New York (state) populated places on the Hudson River